This is a list of instructors in the Clarion West Writers Workshop, a six-week workshop for writers of science fiction, fantasy, and speculative literature, held annually in Seattle, Washington.

Alphabetical
 Daniel Abraham (2018)
 Kathleen Alcalá (2002)
 Charlie Jane Anders (2014))
 Peter S. Beagle (1973, 1988)
 Greg Bear (1988, 1993, 1999)
 Elizabeth Bear (2009, 2016)
 Michael Bishop (1997, 2010)
 Terry Bisson (1996)
 Ed Bryant (1986, 1987)
 Tobias Buckell (2015)
 Emma Bull (1991)
 F. M. Busby
 Octavia E. Butler (1985, 1987, 1999, 2001, 2005)
 Pat Cadigan (1992, 1996, 2002, 2017)
 Orson Scott Card (1988, 1989)
 Terry Carr (1972, 1973, 1984)
 Suzy McKee Charnas (1984, 1986, 1997)
 John Chu (2017)
 Arthur Byron Cover (1984, 1985)
 John Crowley (1992, 1993, 1995, 2000, 2002, 2014)
 Ellen Datlow (1991, 1996, 2001, 2006, 2010, 2013, 2018)
 Avram Davidson (1972)
 Charles de Lint (2004)
 Samuel R. Delany (1971, 1984, 1987, 1991, 1997, 2003, 2007, 2013)
 Bradley Denton (2001)
 Cory Doctorow (2008, 2015)
 Candas Jane Dorsey (2000)
 Gardner Dozois (1988, 1992, 1995, 1998, 2002)
 L. Timmel Duchamp (2005, 2011)
 Andy Duncan (2005, 2015)
 Katherine Dunn (1995)
 George Alec Effinger (1991)
 Harlan Ellison (1971, 1972, 1973)
 Carol Emshwiller (1998, 2000)
 Kelley Eskridge (2007)
 Minister Faust (2011)
 Karen Joy Fowler (1989, 1990, 2009, 2018)
 Neil Gaiman (2013)
 Lisa Goldstein (1994)
 Kathleen Ann Goonan (2003)
 Hiromi Goto (2014)
 Gavin Grant (2012)
 Daryl Gregory (2017)
 Nicola Griffith (1997)
 Eileen Gunn (2015)
 Joe and Gay Haldeman (2002)
 Elizabeth Hand (1994, 2003, 2013)
 David G. Hartwell (1984, 1986, 1990, 2000, 2009)
 Patrick Nielsen Hayden (2003, 2007)
 Frank Herbert (1972)
 Joe Hill (2013)
 Nalo Hopkinson (2001, 2006, 2009, 2015)
 N. K. Jemisin (2016)
 George Clayton Johnson (1971)
 Kij Johnson (2014, 2017)
 Gwyneth Jones (1999)
 Stephen Graham Jones (2012, 2016)
 Graham Joyce (2007, 2010)
 James Patrick Kelly (2004, 2014)
 John Kessel (2004, 2009)
 Tappan Wright King (1987, 1994, 1997)
 Nancy Kress (1992, 1993, 1999, 2003, 2007, 2011)
 Larissa Lai (2004, 2007)
 Margo Lanagan (2011, 2013)
 Ursula K. Le Guin (1971, 1972, 1973, 1987)
 Yoon Ha Lee (2018)
 Kelly Link (2004, 2012)
 Karen Lord (2018)
 Elizabeth A. Lynn (1988)
 Ian MacLeod (2006)
 Ken MacLeod (2018)
 George R. R. Martin (1998, 2012)
 Ian McDonald (2010, 2014)
 Maureen F. McHugh (2006, 2010)
 Vonda N. McIntyre (1984, 1990)
 Patricia A. McKillip (1986)
 Beth Meacham (1994, 1997)
 China Miéville (2003)
 Pat Murphy (1990, 1993, 2000, 2004)
 Nnedi Okorafor (2010)
 Daniel José Older (2017)
 Chuck Palahniuk (2008, 2012)
 Paul Park (1998, 2000, 2002, 2006, 2008, 2011, 2014, 2016)
 Rachel Pollack (1996)
 Marta Randall (1985)
 Mary Rosenblum (2008, 2012)
 Rudy Rucker (2009)
 Joanna Russ (1971, 1973)
 Geoff Ryman (1993, 1996, 2000, 2004, 2016)
 James Sallis (1973)
 Lucius Shepard (1989, 1991, 1993, 1997)
 Will Shetterly (1991)
 Lewis Shiner (1990)
 John Shirley (1992)
 Robert Silverberg (1972)
 Norman Spinrad (1984, 1985, 1986)
 Amy Stout (1989)
 Charles Stross (2011)
 Lucy Sussex (1998)
 Michael Swanwick (1994, 1995, 2005)
 Sheree Thomas (2008)
 Alice K. Turner (1993)
 Lisa Tuttle (1991)
 Gordon Van Gelder (1999, 2005)
 Joan D. Vinge (1986, 1988, 1994)
 Vernor Vinge (2006)
 Howard Waldrop (1992, 1995, 1999)
 Sheila Williams (2016)
 Connie Willis (1987, 1989, 1993, 1998, 2001, 2005, 2008, 2012, 2015, 2017)
 Gene Wolfe (1990)
 Jack Womack (1996, 2001)
 Chelsea Quinn Yarbro (1985)
 Roger Zelazny (1989)

Chronological

1984
Norman Spinrad

1986
 Arthur Byron Cover
 Norman Spinrad

1987
 Ed Bryant
 Octavia E. Butler
 Samuel R. Delany
 Tappan Wright King
 Ursula K. Le Guin
 Connie Willis

1990
 Pat Murphy
 Lewis Shiner
 Karen Joy Fowler
 Gene Wolfe
 David Hartwell
 Vonda N. McIntyre

1991
 Emma Bull and Will Shetterly (joint instructors)
 George Alec Effinger
 Lisa Tuttle
 Lucius Shepard
 Ellen Datlow
 Samuel R. Delany

1992
 Pat Cadigan
 John Crowley
 Gardner Dozois
 Nancy Kress
 John Shirley
 Howard Waldrop

1993
 Pat Murphy (Week 1)
 Geoff Ryman (Week 2)
 Connie Willis (Week 3)
 Lucius Shepard (Week 4)
 Alice K. Turner (Week 5)
 Greg Bear (Week 6)

1995
 John Crowley
 Michael Swanwick

1996
 Terry Bisson
 Pat Cadigan
 Ellen Datlow
 Rachel Pollack
 Geoff Ryman
 Jack Womack

June 22–August 1, 1997 
 Michael Bishop
 Suzy McKee Charnas
 Samuel R. Delany
 Nicola Griffith
 Tappan Wright King
 Beth Meacham
 Lucius Shepard

1998
 Gardner Dozois
 Carol Emshwiller
 George R. R. Martin
 Paul Park
 Lucy Sussex
 Connie Willis

1999
 Greg Bear
 Octavia E. Butler
 Gwyneth Jones
 Nancy Kress
 Gordon Van Gelder
 Howard Waldrop

June 18–July 28, 2000
 John Crowley
 Candas Jane Dorsey
 Carol Emshwiller
 David G. Hartwell
 Pat Murphy
 Paul Park
 Geoff Ryman

June 17–July 27, 2001
 Octavia E. Butler
 Ellen Datlow
 Bradley Denton
 Nalo Hopkinson
 Connie Willis
 Jack Womack

June 23–August 2, 2002
 Kathleen Alcalá
 Pat Cadigan
 John Crowley
 Gardner Dozois
 Joe and Gay Haldeman
 Paul Park

June 22–August 1, 2003
 Samuel R. Delany
 Kathleen Ann Goonan
 Elizabeth Hand
 Patrick Nielsen Hayden
 Nancy Kress
 China Miéville

June 20–July 30, 2004
 Charles de Lint
 James Patrick Kelly
 John Kessel
 Larissa Lai
 Kelly Link
 Pat Murphy
 Geoff Ryman

June 19–July 29, 2005
 Octavia E. Butler
 L. Timmel Duchamp
 Andy Duncan
 Michael Swanwick (Susan C. Petrey Fellow)
 Gordon Van Gelder
 Connie Willis

June 18–July 28, 2006
 Ellen Datlow
 Nalo Hopkinson
 Ian MacLeod
 Maureen F. McHugh
 Paul Park
 Vernor Vinge (Susan C. Petrey Fellow)

June 17–July 27, 2007
 Samuel R. Delany (Susan C. Petrey Fellow)
 Kelley Eskridge
 Patrick Nielsen Hayden
 Graham Joyce
 Nancy Kress
 Larissa Lai

June 22–August 1, 2008
 Cory Doctorow
 Chuck Palahniuk (Susan C. Petrey Fellow)
 Paul Park
 Mary Rosenblum
 Sheree Thomas
 Connie Willis

June 21–July 31, 2009
 Elizabeth Bear
 Karen Joy Fowler
 David Hartwell
 Nalo Hopkinson
 John Kessel
 Rudy Rucker (Susan C. Petrey Fellow)

June 20–July 30, 2010
 Michael Bishop
 Ellen Datlow
 Graham Joyce
 Ian McDonald (Susan C. Petrey Fellow)
 Maureen F. McHugh
 Nnedi Okorafor

June 19–July 28, 2011
 Paul Park
 Nancy Kress
 Margo Lanagan
 Minister Faust
 L. Timmel Duchamp
 Charles Stross

June 17–July 27, 2012
 Mary Rosenblum
 Stephen Graham Jones
 George R.R. Martin
 Connie Willis
 Kelly Link & Gavin Grant
 Chuck Palahniuk

June 23–August 2, 2013
 Elizabeth Hand
 Neil Gaiman
 Joe Hill
 Margo Lanagan
 Samuel R. Delany
 Ellen Datlow

June 22–August 1, 2014
 James Patrick Kelly
 Kij Johnson
 Ian McDonald
 Hiromi Goto
 Charlie Jane Anders
 John Crowley

June 21–July 31, 2015
 Andy Duncan
 Eileen Gunn
 Tobias Buckell
 Susan Palwick
 Nalo Hopkinson
 Cory Doctorow

June 19–July29, 2016
 Paul Park
 Stephen Graham Jones
 Elizabeth Bear
 N. K. Jemisin
 Sheila Williams
 Geoff Ryman

June 18–July 28, 2017
 Daryl Gregory
 Kij Johnson
 John Chu
 Connie Willis
 Daniel José Older
 Pat Cadigan

June 17–July 27, 2018
 Daniel Abraham
 Ken MacLeod
 Yoon Ha Lee
 Karen Lord
 Karen Joy Fowler
 Ellen Datlow

See also
 List of Clarion West Writers Workshop alumni
 Clarion Workshop
 Clarion West Writers Workshop

References

External links
Clarion West Instructors on the Web

Clarion West Writers Workshop instructors
Creative writing programs
Science fiction organizations
Clarion West Writers Workshop instructors
Clarion West Writers Workshop instructors